Dawakin Kudu is a Local Government Area in Kano State, Nigeria. Its headquarters are in the town of Dawakin Kudu.

It has an area of 384 km and a population of 225,389 at the 2006 census.

The district head of Dawakin Kudu in 2009 is Dan Iyan Kano Alhaji Yusuf Bayero and the village head is Sarkin Dawaki Aminu Bala Usman Dawaki.

Dawakin Kudu has the oldest dyeing pit in Kano State.

It is also home to the prestigious Dawakin Kudu Science College, which had produced a great number of medical doctors, engineers and other persons, from Kano State, who have excelled in the fields of science and technology.

The postal code of the area is 713.

References

Local Government Areas in Kano State